Tung Tau Wai or Wang Chau Tung Tau Wai, is a village in Wang Chau, Yuen Long District, Hong Kong.

Administration
Tung Tau Wai (referred to as 'Tung Tau Tsuen' in this context) is a recognized village under the New Territories Small House Policy. Tung Tau Wai is one of the 37 villages represented within the Ping Shan Rural Committee. For electoral purposes, Tung Tau Wai is part of the Ping Shan North constituency.

Features
I Shing Temple or I Shing Kung is a temple in Tung Tau Wai. Built in 1718, it is dedicated to Hung Shing and Che Kung. It was declared a monument in 1996.

Yu Yuen is the largest house in Tung Tau Wai. Built in 1927 as a summer villa by Tsoi Po-tin (1872-1944), a businessman born in the village, it was the private residence of the Tsoi family until 1990. The building was featured in the 1984 film Hong Kong 1941. It is listed as a Grade II historic building.

Tung Tau Wai San Tsuen is a village adjacent to Tung Tau Wai, to its northeast.

References

External links

 Delineation of area of existing village Tung Tau Wai (Ping Shan) for election of resident representative (2019 to 2022)
 Pictures of Yu Yuen

Villages in Yuen Long District, Hong Kong
Wang Chau (Yuen Long)